Colpognathus is a genus of parasitoid wasps belonging to the family Ichneumonidae.

The species of this genus are found in Europe and Northern America.

Species:
 Colpognathus annulicornis Ashmead 
 Colpognathus capitatus (Berthoumieu, 1892)

References

Ichneumonidae
Ichneumonidae genera